The 2022 DTM Trophy is the third season of the DTM support series for GT cars eligible for E2-SH and E2-SC-class FIA categories. It will be the first season where the BOP will be made by AVL Racing. The series will be run by ITR, the association also organising the Deutsche Tourenwagen Masters. The championship will run as part of selected DTM race weekends in 2022, commencing at the Lausitzring on 20 May and finishing on 9 October at the Hockenheimring.

Teams and drivers 
All teams compete with tyres supplied by Hankook.

Calendar

Results and standings

Season summary

Scoring system 
Points were awarded to the top ten classified finishers as follows:

Additionally, the top three placed drivers in qualifying also received points:

Drivers' championship

Teams' championship

Notes

References

External links

DTM Trophy
DTM Trophy